Eridard Kironde Nsubuga is an Anglican bishop who serves in Uganda: he has been Bishop of Luweero since 2015.

Nsubuga was educated at the University of Gloucestershire. He has served in Gloucestershire and Luweero where he was served as Provost of St. Mark's Cathedral, and Archdeacon of Ndejje. He was consecrated a bishop on 17 May 2015, at St Mark's Cathedral, Luweero.

References

21st-century Anglican bishops in Uganda
Uganda Christian University alumni
Anglican bishops of Luweero
Alumni of the University of Gloucestershire
Anglican archdeacons in Africa
Anglican provosts in Africa
Year of birth missing (living people)
Living people